The 18007 / 08 Simlipal Intercity  Express is an Express  train belonging to Indian Railways South Eastern Railway zone that runs between  and  in India.

Coaches
The 18007 / 08 Simlipal Intercity  Express has six general unreserved & two SLR (seating with luggage rake) coaches . It does not carry a pantry car coach.

As is customary with most train services in India, coach composition may be amended at the discretion of Indian Railways depending on demand.

Service

Routing

Traction
As the route is fully electrified, a Santragachi based WAP-4 electric locomotive pulls the train to its destination.

References

External links
18007 Simlipal Intercity Express at India Rail Info
18008  Simlipal Intercity Express at India Rail Info

Intercity Express (Indian Railways) trains
Rail transport in Howrah
Rail transport in West Bengal
Rail transport in Odisha